Group B was one of four groups of nations competing at the 2011 AFC Asian Cup. The group's first round of matches began on 9 January and its last matches were played on 17 January. All six group matches were played at venues in Doha and Al Rayyan, Qatar. The group consisted of defending runners-up Saudi Arabia, Japan, Jordan and Syria.

Standings

All times are UTC+3.

Japan vs Jordan

Saudi Arabia vs Syria

Jordan vs Saudi Arabia

Syria vs Japan

Saudi Arabia vs Japan

Jordan vs Syria

Notes

Group
Group
2010–11 in Jordanian football
2010–11 in Syrian football
2010–11 in Saudi Arabian football